Alessa Ries (born 1981) is a retired German swimmer who won a gold medal in the 4 × 200 m freestyle relay at the 2002 European Aquatics Championships.

She graduated in business economics from the University of Mannheim.

References

1981 births
Living people
German female swimmers
German female freestyle swimmers
European Aquatics Championships medalists in swimming
20th-century German women
21st-century German women